Euzophera lunulella is a species of snout moth in the genus Euzophera. It was described by O.-G. Costa in 1836. It is found in Spain, France, Italy, Albania, North Macedonia, Greece and on Crete.

The wingspan is about 24 mm.

References

Moths described in 1836
Phycitini
Moths of Europe